North Point Worship, formerly known as North Point InsideOut, is an American contemporary worship music band from Alpharetta, Georgia. Their group formed at North Point Community Church in 2012, a non-denominational congregation, a church established by Pastor Andy Stanley. The group released, No One Higher in 2012 and Hear in 2015 with North Point Music. Nothing Ordinary: Part 1 released in June 2017 and Nothing Ordinary: Part 2  released in October 2017 were recorded with Centricity Music.  Two of those albums both charted on the Billboard magazine charts, with the Hear album placing on the Billboard 200 chart. The group is best known for their 2015 hit "Death Was Arrested" featuring Seth Condrey. It peaked at No. 6 on the Billboard Christian Digital Song Sales for four consecutive weeks.

Background
North Point Worship started as a musical entity in 2012, with their first album, No One Higher, that was released in 2012. This album was their breakthrough release on the Billboard magazine charts, where it peaked at No. 20 on the Christian Albums and No. 19 on the Heatseekers Albums charts. Their subsequent album, Hear, was released in 2015, by North Point Music, where this peaked on the Billboard 200 at No. 193 and on the Christian Albums at No. 2. The album was placed at No. 1 on the Worship Leader Top 5 Community Funded/Indie Releases of 2015 list, and the song, "Trust It All", was placed at No. 11 on their Top 20 Songs of 2015 list. North Point InsideOut recorded their third album at Infinite Energy Arena in Gwinnett County, Atlanta, on March 26. They signed a deal with Centricity Music to digitally release their Nothing Ordinary EP on April 7, 2017.

They recorded seven new singles in April 2018: "Unshakable Love", "On My Way Back Home", "Not the Same", "Changed", "All the World", "By My Side" and "Wide Open". They released their fourth studio album, North Point InsideOut, on November 16, 2018. "Here I Am", was released on June 21, 2019.

In 2020, North Point InsideOut renamed itself North Point Worship and announced its intention of releasing 12 new songs that year.

Discography

Studio albums

Extended plays

Singles

InsideOut ministry

The InsideOut ministry is the high school department of North Point Ministries. Thousands of high school students in the metro Atlanta area come to North Point's six locations every Sunday night including North Point Community Church, Browns Bridge Church, Gwinnett Church, Buckhead Church, Decatur City Church, and Woodstock City Church. Every Sunday, along with church music, students listen to their campuses' pastor, go to small group, and later eat dinner with their friends. InsideOut also has three church retreats every year including The Walk, MyLife, and Vertical Reality. The North Point InsideOut band gets to share new songs with students every retreat.

References

Musical groups from Georgia (U.S. state)
1995 establishments in Georgia (U.S. state)
Musical groups established in 1995